Clap Hands, Here Comes Charlie (/ Charley) can refer to:

"Clap Hands! Here Comes Charley!," a 1925 song by Billy Rose, Ballard MacDonald and Joseph Meyer
Clap Hands, Here Comes Charlie!, a 1961 studio album by Ella Fitzgerald